Morristown & Erie Railway  is a short-line railroad based in Morristown, New Jersey, chartered in 1895 as the Whippany River Railroad. It operates freight rail service in Morris County, New Jersey and surrounding areas on the original Whippany Line between Morristown and Roseland, as well as the Morris County-owned Dover & Rockaway Branch, Chester Branch, and High Bridge Branch. The M&E also operated the Maine Eastern Railroad from November 2003 to December 31, 2015.

History
The modern Morristown & Erie traces its roots to the original Whippany River Railroad, chartered on August 1, 1895, and hastily constructed to connect Morristown and Whippany. Interchange was established with the Delaware, Lackawanna & Western Railroad (DL&W) at Morristown. When the railroad defaulted on their bonds, paper mill owner Robert W. McEwan purchased the line from its creditors in 1896. Thanks to the numerous mills and other customers located along the line, the railroad enjoyed success and was looking to expand.

Seeking a connection with the Erie Railroad, McEwan chartered the Whippany & Passaic River Railroad in 1902 to build a line from Whippany to Essex Fells. Having access to two major railroads meant that McEwan's customers could enjoy competitive shipping rates from both connections. On August 28, 1903, the Whippany River Railroad and the Whippany & Passaic River Railroad were merged into the new Morristown & Erie Railroad.

M&E operated a modest passenger service, but automobile competition ended that in 1928. Freight business grew as the mills along the line kept switching crews busy.

Decline
The economic downturn associated with the Great Depression affected M&E. Frugal management kept the railroad viable through the worst of the 1930s. M&E would be the only U.S. railroad to rid itself of all debt during the era leading up to World War II. The railroad passed out of the McEwan family by 1943 and continued under new management. In 1952, the line received its first diesel, an S-4 from Alco.

When Andrew J. Cobb III assumed the presidency in 1961, many of the mills that had been steady customers began to shut down and consolidate. In 1960, DL&W and Erie Railroad merged to form Erie Lackawanna Railway, eliminating competition for shipping rates to M&E.

By the 1970s, the Northeastern railroad industry was in decline, and M&E looked to alternative revenue streams. The Morristown shop was leased to a locomotive rebuilder for a period of time, but it was not enough. The last paper mill had closed and carloads were down to a dozen per week. The railroad tried to invest its freight earnings into non-transportation areas, but these experiments failed. By 1978 the railroad filed bankruptcy.

Rebirth
A consortium of businessmen under the leadership of Benjamin J. Friedland purchased M&E in 1982, and immediately set to work on rebuilding the business as the Morristown & Erie Railway. Investments were made in track and repairing locomotives. Aggressive marketing helped bring traffic back to M&E. Friedland became a spokesperson for short line railroading, and was able to use these connections to help grow his business. He also had a strong sense of history, and is also credited with the opening of the Whippany Railway Museum in 1985.

Around this same time, Friedland helped orchestrate the purchase of the Chester Branch, and began operating the line under contract for the new owners on December 21, 1983. He also worked with Morris County officials to help purchase and operate remnants of the former Central Railroad of New Jersey Dover & Rockaway and High Bridge branches in 1986. The M&E also briefly operated the New Hope & Ivyland Railroad between 1989 and 1990.

While the M&E enjoyed modest growth throughout the 1980s, the railroad continued to seek out new opportunities for expansion. In 1995, Friedland negotiated a contract with Tosco (formerly ConocoPhillips, now Phillips 66) to be the contract operator for switching operations at Bayway Refinery in Linden, New Jersey. Bayway is one of the largest refineries on the East Coast.

The untimely 1998 death of Friedland shocked the company and short line industry that had come to respect him as a leader. In his 16 years at the helm of the M&E, he ascended from an obscure railroader to an industry icon. The New Jersey Short Line Railroad Association has an award named in his honor "for meritorious service to the short line industry."

The expansion of M&E continued after Friedland's death. In 2001, the M&E was selected to repair and operate the Linden-Cranford, New Jersey segment of the Staten Island Railway (SIRY) and Cranford-Summit, New Jersey segment of the former Rahway Valley Railroad (RVRR) as the newly created Union County Central Railroad. M&E entered into a 10-year agreement with Union County starting on May 15, 2002, for the rehabilitation and operation of these dormant freight lines. Conrail objected to the filing as M&E would need trackage rights over NJ Transit's Raritan Valley Line to travel between the ex-SIRY and ex-RVRR. Conrail had previously negotiated exclusive trackage rights with NJT back in 1984, but expressed willingness to work out a special arrangement with M&E should service resume. As of May 2012, M&E removed their equipment from the RVRR and SIRY, pursuant to the 10-year agreement with Union County.

The M&E would embark on its second foray into Pennsylvania, operating the SEPTA-owned Octoraro Railroad from July 1, 2003, to November 18, 2004. The line is currently operated by the East Penn Railroad.

On November 1, 2003, M&E took over operation of the Rockland Branch, a former Maine Central Railroad line now owned by the state of Maine. M&E created a subsidiary, the Maine Eastern Railroad, for its Maine operations. Seasonal excursion passenger trains were operated between Brunswick and Rockland, Maine. As of January 1, 2016, the operation of the line has been taken over by the Central Maine and Quebec Railway, which was later acquired by Canadian Pacific Railway in June 2020.

In 2009, the M&E took over contract operations of the Stourbridge Railroad (former Lackawaxen & Stourbridge), based in Honesdale, Pennsylvania. Passenger excursions continued to be sponsored by Wayne County. Operations were quietly suspended in 2012. Service return in 2015 is under the auspices of Myles Group.

Dover & Rockaway River Railroad (D&R) takes over service and maintenance of the Chester, Dover & Rockaway and High Bridge Branches effective July 1, 2017.

Current operations
To get between its lines, the M&E has trackage rights on New Jersey Transit's (NJT) Morristown Line and Montclair-Boonton Line west of West End (the junction at the west end of the Bergen Tunnel with NJT's Main Line); it uses the Main Line and the Bergen County Line to interchange with the New York, Susquehanna & Western Railway at Passaic Junction (rail yard). M&E locomotives are NJT cab-signal equipped and not considered to be foreign railroad power on NJT lines. Freight is interchanged with Norfolk Southern Railway (NS) at Lake Junction and with Conrail Shared Assets (CSAO) and CSX at Center Street, Harrison (east of Newark Broad Street on the NJT M&E main line).

In addition to freight service, M&E operates charter passenger service and rents railcars and conducts contract rebuilds of passenger cars. It also allows film production companies to rent equipment for filming. Recent films including Far from Heaven, Mona Lisa Smile and The Station Agent, as well as the reality television series The Next Food Network Star and some TV commercials have been filmed using M&E equipment. Scenes for Shontelle's music video for the song "Say Hello to Goodbye" were filmed on at M&E's Whippany passenger car storage facility in summer 2011.

In conjunction with Conrail Shared Assets, the M&E operates as the switching and terminal railroad at ConocoPhillips' Linden Terminal/Bayway Refinery)

Lehigh Limited 

In May 2013 M&E announced its first public main line excursion in nearly three decades in the form of the Lehigh Limited operated in cooperation with NS and NJT operating from Hoboken Terminal to Bethlehem, Pennsylvania on August 24, 2013 to commemorate the railroad's 110th anniversary. The Lehigh Limited'''s two first class observation cars (the Kitchi Gammi Club and Babbling Brook) and the train’s snack car (the Birken) were on display at Grand Central Terminal (GCT) in New York City on May 11 and 12 during the Parade of Trains exhibit for GCT's centennial celebration.

Active Branches

Whippany line
The Whippany line is M&E's original main line, in use since 1903 and with some portions dating back to 1895. The 9-mile (14.48 km) line runs between Baker Interlocking (connection with NJT's Morristown Line in Morristown, where M&E's main office, yard, and shop are located) northeast to Roseland in Essex County. The line is single track and has many grade crossings. It serves Cedar Knolls and Whippany in Hanover Township, and East Hanover and Roseland. The line currently ends east of Interstate 280 in Roseland. The outer half-mile has been out of service since customer Bobst Group, Inc. closed it doors. Track conditions have since degraded.

NJT has expressed interest in the line. In 2000 the agency placed the M&E under "projects to be defined/studied" for the year 2020.

Station list

Former Branches

On July 1, 2017, the Dover and Rockaway River Railroad took over operation of the following three Morris County owned rail lines:

 Chester Branch 

The former DLW Chester Branch was extended in 1869 to Chester, New Jersey, to serve the local mining industry. A connection with the CNJ Chester Branch also existed. In the early 1950s DLW abandoned and tore up their Chester Branch from the CNJ connection near Chester to Succasunna. In 1983 Conrail planned to abandon the branch line, but Holland Manufacturing and Westinghouse Elevator purchased the line to continue rail services to their facilities. In 2009, Morris County, New Jersey, purchased the line and leased rail operations to M&E. Branching off from Lake Junction, it ends in Succasunna. M&E freight service uses this line to access the High Bridge Branch at Ferromonte Junction. The line was rehabilitated in 2010 with the use of federal stimulus funds obtained by the line's new owner, Morris County Department of Transportation.

Customers
Holland Manufacturing, Succasunna (adhesives, paper products)
Kuiken Brothers Company, Succasunna (lumber, building materials)

 High Bridge Branch 

This is one of two branch lines M&E began operating in 1986. The High Bridge branch is owned by Morris County, New Jersey, and is leased to M&E. A former Central Railroad of New Jersey line called the High Bridge Branch, it splits from the Chester Branch at Ferromonte Junction and heads southwest through Succasunna and Flanders. The line ends west of U.S. Route 206 in Flanders. Originally excluded from the Conrail system in 1976, the line remained in service under a subsidy agreement by local authorities until 1981. Morris County purchased the line from the state in 1982. There was talk New Jersey Transit would use the line to connect their lines at High Bridge and Lake Junction to Hacketstown in 1983 but the plan never fell through. The line south of Flanders to High Bridge was then dismantled and later became the Columbia Trail in 1995. 

Customers
Blue Ridge Lumber, Kenvil (Kenvil Team Track)'' (lumber, building materials)
Triumph Plastics, Flanders (plastic)
Toys R Us Warehouse, Flanders (out of service since 2008)

Dover & Rockaway branch 

Originally the Dover & Rockaway Railroad, the second of two former CNJ lines taken over by M&E in 1986. The line operates from D&R Junction (where it meets the NJ Transit Morristown Line) in Wharton through downtown Dover northeast to Rockaway. The line ends along Green Pond Road in Rockaway Township, north of Interstate 80. This line passes through downtown Dover and Rockaway with many street crossings. All the customers on this branch are located in an industrial park along Green Pond Road, at the north end of the branch.

Customers
Polyfil, Rockaway (plastics - polymer additives)
Endot, Rockaway (plastics - piping)
TriPak, Rockaway (plastics - packaging)
84 Lumber, Rockaway (lumber, building materials)

Rahway Valley Railroad Revitalization

In 2001 the M&E was selected to repair and operate a rail line consisting of the New Jersey portion of the Staten Island Railroad between Linden and Cranford, and the former Rahway Valley Railroad between Cranford and Summit. Both sections are now known as the Rahway Valley Railroad. The New Jersey Department of Transportation owns the lines, and the County of Union administers the contract. As of late 2006, only the southern portion of the Rahway Valley Railroad has been restored, as the restoration of the northern portion from Summit to Cranford is being challenged in court and lacks sufficient county funding. The first M&E train ran on the southern portion of the line on July 13, 2005.

The intention was that Union County would work to revive freight service on the former Rahway Valley Railroad route from Summit to a connection with the former Staten Island Railway and Conrail at Cranford, New Jersey. The M&E would be the operator of any reactivated Rahway Valley line service from Summit to Cranford. Operation of the Rahway Valley line from Summit to Cranford would allow the M&E to access their operations at the Bayway Refinery in Linden via a more direct connection using trackage rights over the Morris and Essex lines and would provide freight service to customers along the Rahway Valley, which was abandoned in 1992. It would also allow interchange with the recently reactivated Staten Island Railway freight connection to New Jersey.

As of 2012, the M&E's contract with Union County to rehab the Rahway Valley between Summit and Cranford had expired and was not renewed.

Morristown & Erie locomotive roster

Morristown & Erie rolling stock roster

See also 
 Morristown and Erie Railroad Whippany Water Tank

References

External links

 

New Jersey railroads
Railway companies established in 1895
Companies based in Morris County, New Jersey
1895 establishments in New Jersey